Hans-Ludwig Speth (7 October 1897 – 30 April 1985) was a German general during World War II who commanded the 28th Jäger Division. He was a recipient of the Knight's Cross of the Iron Cross of Nazi Germany.

Awards and decorations

 Knight's Cross of the Iron Cross on 23 February 1944 as Generalleutnant and commander of 28. Jäger-Division

References

Citations

Bibliography

1897 births
1985 deaths
German Army generals of World War II
Generals of Artillery (Wehrmacht)
German Army personnel of World War I
People from the Grand Duchy of Hesse
People from Wetteraukreis
Recipients of the clasp to the Iron Cross, 1st class
Recipients of the Gold German Cross
Recipients of the Knight's Cross of the Iron Cross
Military personnel from Hesse